Plas Power railway station may refer to the following Welsh stations:

 Plas Power railway station (Wrexham, Mold and Connah's Quay Railway)
 Plas Power railway station (Wrexham and Minera Railway)